Sui Donglu (Simplified Chinese: 隋东陆) (born June 21, 1982 in Dalian) is a professional Chinese footballer as a defender for Chinese club Dalian Jinshiwan.

Club career

Early career
Sui Donglu began his football career playing for Yunnan Hongta in the 2003 league season where in his debut season he would go on to make 11 league appearances. His development was stunted the following season when Yunnan merged with Chongqing Lifan F.C. and the increase in squad size saw him often dropped from the senior team into the reserves. Sui was allowed to leave for second tier side Jiangsu Sainty the next season to kick-start his career. While at his new club he gained considerably more playing time and attracted the interests of top tier side Shenzhen Kingway.

Shenzhen Kingway
Joining Shenzhen Kingway at the beginning of the 2006 league season he would be allowed to gradually establish himself within the team's defence, with the Shenzhen manager Wang Baoshan showing considerable faith in him, however this would not last and Wang left before the end of the season. This saw Sui dropped from the first team the following season and would have to prove himself in the reserves before he was given his chance to become a regular within the team during the 2008 league season. Despite several managers coming in during the 2008 campaign all kept faith with Sui however at the beginning of the 2009 league season Shenzhen appointed Fan Yuhong who dropped him into the reserves once again before transfer listing him.

Chengdu Blades
Allowed to leave Sui Donglu would join his former boss Wang Baoshan with Chengdu Blades and play in the second tier. He would initially struggle to gain a place within the team and spent much of his time on the bench until he made his debut on May 2, 2010 in a league game against Shenyang Dongjin where he came on as a late substitute for Johnson Macaba in a 0-0 draw. Gaining more playing as the season went on he would go on to be a vital member of the team and would go on to play in twelve league games, scoring one goal while he helped Chengdu come runners-up within the league and promotion back to the top tier.

Club career statistics
Statistics accurate as of match played 31 December 2019.

Honours

Club
Chongqing Lifan
China League One: 2014

References

External links
 
Player profile at Titan24.com
Player stats at Sohu.com

1983 births
Living people
Chinese footballers
Footballers from Dalian
Yunnan Hongta players
Chongqing Liangjiang Athletic F.C. players
Jiangsu F.C. players
Shenzhen F.C. players
Chengdu Tiancheng F.C. players
Changsha Ginde players
Guangzhou City F.C. players
Henan Songshan Longmen F.C. players
Chinese Super League players
China League One players
Association football defenders